Appalachian Trail station is a commuter rail stop on the Metro-North Railroad's Harlem Line, serving campers and hikers destined for the Appalachian Trail, in Pawling, New York. It is the only rail station directly located on the Appalachian Trail. Trains stop at here on Saturdays, Sundays, and holidays only.

Description and history

The station was built in three months by Metro-North Railroad forces in 1990 for the cost of $10,000. The station opened on April 1, 1990. Its creation was the suggestion of George Zoebelein, who was an avid hiker and a veteran of the NY/NJ Trail Conference as well as both the NY/NJ Appalachian Trail Conferences, and also served as a member of the Metro-North Railroad Commuter Council (MNRCC) of the Permanent Citizens Advisory Committee (PCAC) to the Metropolitan Transportation Authority.

The trail itself crosses the track just south of the station. In the northbound direction, it leads immediately to a small grassy parking area along Route 22 with space for a few cars, then follows the highway to paved turnouts with more space a few hundred feet north along either side of the highway, just north of where it leaves the road and starts climbing toward Hammersly Ridge and the Pawling Nature Preserve. South of the station the trail crosses a swampy area via a wooden, wheelchair accessible walkway which leads to a bridge and then climbs a smaller ridge.

Station layout
The station has a low-level wooden side platform to the east of the track, long enough for one door of one car to receive and discharge passengers. The platform has no shelter, but has a bulletin board for posting the current train schedule, as well as information for hikers.

References

External links

Metro-North Railroad stations in New York (state)
Appalachian Trail
Pawling, New York
Railway stations in Dutchess County, New York
Railway stations in the United States opened in 1990
1990 establishments in New York (state)
Transportation in Dutchess County, New York